Anne Elizabeth Dunlop  is a Canadian-born art historian. As of 2022 she is Herald Chair of Fine Art at the University of Melbourne.

Education 
Dunlop graduated with a BA from Queen's University at Kingston in Canada. She next completed an MA at the University of British Columbia. She moved to the University of Warwick in Coventry, England where she gained her PhD with a thesis titled "Advocata nostra: Central Italian paintings of Mary as the Second Eve, c.1335–c.1445".

Career 
In 2009–2010 Dunlop held a Hanna Kiel Fellowship at Villa I Tatti in Florence. While at Tulane University in 2012–2013, she was a Samuel H. Kress senior fellow, focusing her research on "Castagno's Crime: Andrea del Castagno and Quattrocento Painting", in preparation for publication of Andrea del Castagno and the Limits of Painting in 2015. From August to December 2016 she was Robert Lehman visiting professor at Villa I Tatti, where she conducted a survey of "The Golden Renaissance".

Dunlop was elected a Fellow of the Australian Academy of the Humanities in 2019. In the same year she was appointed to the advisory board of Melbourne University Publishing in the field of art history.

In 2015 Dunlop was named Herald Chair of Fine Arts by the University of Melbourne. She serves as an Australian national delegate to the International Congress of the History of Art.

Selected publications

References 

Living people
Queen's University at Kingston alumni
University of British Columbia alumni
Alumni of the University of Warwick
Academic staff of the University of Melbourne
Fellows of the Australian Academy of the Humanities
Canadian art historians
Year of birth missing (living people)